Mount Arronax is an ice-covered, pointed peak in Antarctica.

Location 
Black Pass runs northeast–southwest, 3 nautical miles (6 km) west of Mount Arronax.

Climbing history 
It was first surveyed in 1936 by the British Graham Land Expedition (BGLE) under Rymill. It was resurveyed in 1948 by the Falkland Islands Dependencies Survey (FIDS) and named after Professor Pierre Arronax, the central character in Jules Verne's Twenty Thousand Leagues Under the Sea. A number of features on the island are named for characters in the book.

References 

Mountains of Graham Land
Fallières Coast